Tarom-e Gur Sefid (also Romanized as Ţārom-e Gūr Sefīd; also known as Ţārom and Ţabībābād) is a village in Poshtkuh Rural District, in the Central District of Firuzkuh County, Tehran Province, Iran. At the 2006 census, its population was 49, in 10 families.

References 

Populated places in Firuzkuh County